Larry Tomczak is a self-proclaimed "apostolic leader" and evangelist. His ministry began in 1972. He led People of Destiny International, a pioneering church planting movement which has established almost 60 churches in the US and abroad (though now under a different ministry name and leadership).

He was editor of People of Destiny magazine and has authored several books, including the quarter-million best seller, Clap Your Hands, the Church Planters Handbook (co-author), Divine Appointments, Reckless Abandon, and The Bullseye Challenge. Larry has been a board member of the "Intercessors for America" ministry for almost 40 years and was an instructor at the Brownsville Revival School of Ministry. He has been married for over 40 years with four grown children. He serves as Executive Director of The Awareness Group (T. A. G.) and resides in the Nashville area.

Early life
Tomczak was born into a Roman Catholic family in Ohio, and in his youth was part of a local rock band.

He became an Evangelical during the charismatic renewal of the 1970s, as described in his book, Clap Your Hands.
Working with C.J. Mahaney, Tomczak co-founded the Covenant Life Church which would eventually become known as the Sovereign Grace Churches. Tomczak eventually left the ministry in 1998, citing theological difference in his leaving. Some of this period's tensions also arose because Tomczak's fitness as a father was called into question by church leadership over what Tomczak described as the "teenage rebellion" of his son in which Tomczak claimed to be blackmailed by the ministry. In a 2011 email released by Sovereign Grace Ministries, dated July 4, it is understood that Tomczak and C.J. Mahaney, the senior pastor at Sovereign Grace Church of Louisville have since been reconciled and Mr. Mahaney has made a full apology to Larry and his family for any actions or misunderstandings on the part of the ministry. Although Larry was invited to the Leaders Conference in November 2011, the invitation was withdrawn after some time.

Slander Lawsuit Settlement

In 1983, Tomczak paid $150,000 to settle a lawsuit for repeatedly slandering psychiatrist Thomas Anthony Harris and his wife, Amy, authors of the best-seller I'm O.K. - You're OK.

In 1983 The New York Times reported that Tomczak repeatedly and publicly claimed "'Most people today don't know that the author of that book committed suicide about two years ago, and yet people are still practicing some of his philosophies." Dr. Harris was still alive, and in fact died 12 years later at the age of 85.

According to Dr. Harris, the lies "hurt his reputation, forced cancellation of speaking appearances, and caused a 50 percent drop in book sales."

Views on homosexuality
Tomczak subscribes to the research of Paul Cameron which claims that gays and lesbians suffer higher rates of mental illness and suicide, among other things, and links these to their inherent sexuality. Tomczak has expressed his view that sexual orientation is a learned behavior:

People are not born homosexual. According to Scripture and science, homosexuality is not part of someone's biological constitution. People will argue to the contrary, but being gay is not like left-handedness. There is absolutely no scientific evidence of a gay gene. Nature or nurture? The answer is the latter. This is not opinion; it's truth.

In January 2015, Tomczak wrote a letter on The Christian Post to television personality Ellen DeGeneres, after she mentioned a recent article of his on her show to argue "I don't have an agenda".

On Donald Trump

Throughout 2020, Tomczak was a strong supporter of Donald Trump's reelection campaign. On November 19, 2020 Tomczak posted a video. Therein he claims that "...the fact that Dems have stolen the election." Tomczak also claimed that Donald Trump would prevail through "divine intervention."

Bibliography

The Little Handbook On Loving Correction: How To Raise Happy, Obedient, Respectful Children,
Clap Your Hands,

Divine Appointments

Reckless Abandon

God, the rod, and Your child's bod: The art of loving correction for Christian parents
Founding editor of People of Destiny magazine.

External links
 Official website.

References

Living people
American religious leaders
American Christian clergy
American Charismatics
Writers from Ohio
Converts to evangelical Christianity from Roman Catholicism
Year of birth missing (living people)